Lakewood is an unincorporated community in Wayne Township, DuPage County, Illinois, United States. Lakewood is located at the northeastern border of West Chicago.

References

Unincorporated communities in DuPage County, Illinois
Unincorporated communities in Illinois